Wikipedia and the Democratization of Knowledge is a German documentary film by the directors Lorenza Castella and Jascha Hannover. Released on January 5, 2021, for the WDR in cooperation with Arte.

Synopsis 
The film takes a look at the twenty-year history of Wikipedia. The development from the forerunner Nupedia to the start of the project in 2001 and up to 2020, in which Wikipedia has developed into by far the largest encyclopedia of all time with over 50 million articles in many languages, is shown.

In addition to the founders Jimmy Wales and Larry Sanger, authors from Germany, France, Ghana, South Africa, the United States and other countries discuss their thoughts on the project.

Both successes and critical aspects of the project are discussed. The influence exerted by politicians, states and companies, and the limited representation of women's biographies and topics from Africa or Asia articles are topics in the film.

Towards the end of the film, a South African Wikipedian with the native language Xitsonga is introduced, who was disappointed that there were only about eighty articles in the Xitsonga language Wikipedia when he first started. He could not easily expand and edit them, since Wikipedia requires written, verifiable sources. In his culture, oral transmission of stories is main methos for passing on legends and myths over the generations. The verifiable information recorded in writing was mainly recorded by "colonialist, white Europeans." In some cases, these accounts differed significantly from the views and information concerning the ethnic group. Not all information of humankind is passed on as verifiable information recorded in writing, but much also in the form of oral transmission. Therefore, Wikipedia's quality criteria cannot fully address sources describing this culture. The film continues to discuss whether a further innovation of Wikipedia is necessary. Making it possible for editors to record information from oral traditions. In this context, it questions the previous conception of knowledge verifiability from the written record is Eurocentric. Whether Wikipedia, which is based exclusively on the written, verifiable information, can be called "neutral", or only reflect a western, Eurocentric view.

Production and distribution 
The film was a production by Florianfilm GmbH on behalf of WDR and in cooperation with Arte.

The first broadcast on German free TV took place on 5 January 2021 at 11:50 p.m. on Arte. The film was available two days earlier in the Arte's online media library and was uploaded to YouTube on 4 January. An English subtitled version is available on the website since 15 January 2021, and on the same day an English-language dubbed version was posted to YouTube. Four other subtitled versions are available on the website: in French with the title Il était une fois Wikipédia since 3 January (uploaded with dubbing on 4 January on YouTube), in Polish with the title Wikipedia - demokratyczna utopia czy stracona szansa? since 14 January, in Spanish with the title La promesa de Wikipedia since 15 January, and in Italian with the title Wikipedia: la conoscenza è per tutti? also since 15 January. These six releases will be withdrawn from the site on 4 April 2021.

Reception 
In a review for Deutschlandfunk Kultur, Matthias Dell described the film as a good overview of the history of the project, trying to "weigh up and objectify" a lot. Otherwise, the film is only vague and works "like an average Wikipedia entry" according to Dell. For him, the discussion about standards of knowledge production is the strongest point of the film – for instance, how Western standards of knowledge production should apply to parts of the world that are non-Western-influenced and have a stronger oral tradition of knowledge transfer. However, regarding questions like how objective knowledge can be, what the standards for relevance are in a global perspective or what role Wikipedia could play in the media platform economy, to Dell the film "is not a unique contribution". The general enthusiastic tone left Dell with the impression that it was a "promotional film" for Wikipedia.

In a review for the daily newspaper Neues Deutschland, Bahareh Ebrahimi wrote that the documentary shows the "contradictions of a once utopian project". According to Ebrahimi, "the once radical lexicon, which actually wanted nothing to do with traditional science, is very similar to traditional – western – science 20 years after its foundation". The film shows that "Wikipedia authors now call themselves New World historians", but have "almost the same problem as the old historians", namely wanting to work globally "without being able to think globally".

See also
Bibliography of Wikipedia
List of films about Wikipedia

References

External links 
 
 

Films about Wikipedia
German documentary films
2021 films